Evolve (stylized as ƎVOLVE) is the third studio album by American pop rock band Imagine Dragons, released on June 23, 2017, by Kidinakorner and Interscope Records. After the release of their previous album Smoke + Mirrors (2015) and its respective world tour, a self-imposed hiatus for 2016 and cryptic messages from the band through their social media gained anticipation for their third album; it was finally announced on May 9, 2017, along with the initiation of its pre-order. In comparison to Smoke + Mirrors and their 2012 debut Night Visions, frontman Dan Reynolds called the album an "evolution" for the band.

Evolve peaked at number 2 on the US Billboard 200, and received mixed reviews from critics; some acknowledged the band's claim of evolution, while others described it as lifeless and commercially oriented. It was promoted with the singles "Believer", "Thunder", "Whatever It Takes", and "Next to Me", as well as a world tour produced by Live Nation and supported with Grouplove and K.Flay that started in September 2017. The album was also nominated for the Grammy Award for Best Pop Vocal Album at the 60th Annual Grammy Awards.

Background
In February 2016, after the success of their second album Smoke + Mirrors and a ten month long world tour, the members of Imagine Dragons vowed to take time off from the band. In an interview with Billboard, lead singer Dan Reynolds stated that the group would be on hiatus for the remainder of the year, explaining "We [Imagine Dragons] haven't stopped in, like, six years, so we've forced ourselves to at least take a year off." Throughout 2016, the band contributed songs to the soundtracks for Me Before You, Suicide Squad and Passengers, as well as playing at several shows.

The band first began preparing their third album on September 13, 2016, with a picture of guitarist Wayne Sermon in the band's recording studio and continued releasing cryptic messages over the next four months. On January 24, 2017, the band tweeted "goodnight +", effectively ending the Smoke + Mirrors album cycle.

Composition
Reynolds had noted that the album, compared to Night Visions and Smoke + Mirrors, is "an evolution for Imagine Dragons". The album's sound has been described as pop rock, electronic, pop and EDM while containing elements of R&B and hip hop.

Promotion
In the months leading up to the album's release, Imagine Dragons used the caption "ƎE" in multiple social media posts. The group announced the title of their third album on May 8, and started the album pre-order along with the release of "Whatever It Takes" at 9 PM PT.

Singles
Starting on January 28, 2017, the band tweeted a series of four videos to tease the album's first single. The time-lapse videos featured lead singer Dan Reynolds drawing surreal images on a drawing pad. Morse code was hidden in the videos and translated to "objects of same color". On February 1, 2017, "Believer" was released as the lead single. To promote the single, it was used in a Super Bowl LI commercial for the Nintendo Switch. It was also used in the trailer for the 2017 film Murder on the Orient Express. The song peaked at number four on the Billboard Hot 100. Its music video starring Reynolds and actor Dolph Lundgren was released on March 7, 2017.

On April 27, 2017, "Thunder" was released as the second single. It peaked at number four on the Hot 100. The music video was filmed in Dubai and directed by Joseph Kahn, and was released on May 2, 2017.

On May 9, 2017, "Whatever It Takes" was released as the third single alongside the announcement of the album title. It peaked at number 12 on the Billboard Hot 100. It was initially released as the album's first promotional single.

On February 21, 2018, "Next to Me" was released as the fourth single, alongside the announcement of extended summer tour dates.

Promotional singles
On June 15, 2017, "Walking the Wire" was made available for download with any purchase from the band's online shop.

Tour and film
On May 9, 2017, the band announced on Twitter the Evolve World Tour, which started on September 26, 2017, in Phoenix, Arizona. The tour was produced by Live Nation, with Grouplove and K.Flay as special guests.

On March 8, 2018, Billboard reported that the band had become the first act in history to "monopolize the top four spots on Billboard's Alternative Digital Song Sales chart, ranking at Nos. 1-4 on the March 10-dated tally." On March 13, Billboard reported that the album had become the "first album to generate at least three No. 1s on Billboards Alternative Songs airplay chart this decade." Also that day, the band released a cinematic film for their song, "Next to Me".

Critical reception

Evolve received generally mixed to negative reviews from critics upon release. On Metacritic, the album received a weighted average score of 47/100 based on seven reviews, indicating "mixed or average reviews". The album received a few positive-leaning reviews. Glenn Gamboa from Newsday gave the album a score of B+, stating that the group, "seem ready to transcend genre labels — they just want to make good music that interests them." In a three-out-of-five-star review from NME, Alex Flood wrote, "This latest effort might represent a small progression, but it's far from an evolution." AllMusic also gave a three-out-of-five review on the album, with Stephen Thomas Erlewine saying, "its bold, colorful textures elbow aside any notions of introspection or reflection." Rob Harvilla from The Ringer gave the album a mixed review, concluding: "All of which is to say that Evolve isn’t great by any means, but it’s awfully shrewd, and you might end up rooting for it if only because there’s nobody else to root for. It’s probably the band’s best album: It is definitely their slickest, their deftest, their shortest."

The album also garnered some negative reviews. In a more negative review, Classic Rock Magazine gave the album one and a half stars out of five, commenting that the band aims for more rock noise, although, "it [Evolve] just comes off like Michael Bolton dad dancing to Justin Timberlake at a family wedding." Hannah J. Davies of The Guardian gave the album two stars out of five, calling the album, "lifeless electronic-tinged arena rock." The Independent gave Evolve two-out-of-five stars, describing it as, "mostly devolving back into the hoariest of tired rock cliches (including what sounds like roto-toms), and plodding grimly towards the summer’s festivals."

On Metacritic, Evolve is one of the lowest ranking albums of 2017.

Commercial performance
Evolve debuted at number two on the US Billboard 200 with 147,000 album-equivalent units, of which 109,000 were pure album sales. It is Imagine Dragons' third top five album. As of August 31, 2021, the album has been certified 3× Platinum by the RIAA.

Track listing

Personnel
Credits adapted from AllMusic.
 Dan Reynolds – lead vocals, keyboards, backing vocals, acoustic guitar
 Wayne Sermon – electric guitar, backing vocals, acoustic guitar
 Ben McKee – bass guitar, keyboards, backing vocals
 Daniel Platzman – drums, percussion, backing vocals
 Serban Ghenea – mixing
 Manny Marroquin – mixing
 Tom Coyne – mastering
 Randy Merrill – mastering

Charts

Weekly charts

Year-end charts

Decade-end charts

Certifications

See also 
List of number-one albums of 2017 (Canada)
List of number-one albums of 2017 (Finland)
List of number-one albums of 2017 (Norway)
List of number-one hits of 2017 (Switzerland)

References

2017 albums
Imagine Dragons albums
Albums produced by Alex da Kid
Albums produced by Joel Little
Albums produced by Mattman & Robin
Interscope Records albums
Interscope Geffen A&M Records albums
Kidinakorner albums